Vemgo-Mabas is an Afro-Asiatic language of Cameroon and Nigeria. Dialects are Vemgo, Mabas. Blench (2006) considers these to be separate languages. Ethnologue lists a third dialect, Visik in Nigeria, which is not well attested; Blench suspects it may be a dialect of Lamang instead.

In Cameroon, Mabas is spoken only in one village on the Nigerian border, namely Mabas village (Mokolo arrondissement, Mayo-Tsanaga department, Far North Region) by about 5,000 speakers (ALCAM 1984). Although closely related, Mabas is distinct from Hdi (78% lexical similarity, 36% mutual intelligibility).

References 

Biu-Mandara languages
Languages of Cameroon